Swan Songs B-Sides is the first EP by American rap rock band Hollywood Undead. It was released on June 23, 2009, and consists of 4 B-side songs that were recorded during the sessions of the album Swan Songs but didn't make the album.

These four tracks were previously available as bonus tracks on different editions of the album. "The Loss" was released on the Indie Store edition of the album, and "The Natives" was released on the Smartpunk edition, while both "Pain" and "Knife Called Lust" were released on UK and Japanese editions of the albums, while "Pain" was also available on the iTunes edition.

The EP was later released on physical 7" as part of Record Store Day 2009.

Track listing

Personnel

Hollywood Undead
Aron "Deuce" Erlichman – vocals, bass guitar, keyboards
Jordon "Charlie Scene" Terrell – vocals, lead guitar
Jorel "J-Dog" Decker – vocals, rhythm guitar, bass guitar, keyboards, synthesizers, programming
George "Johnny 3 Tears" Ragan – vocals
Dylan "Funny Man" Alvarez – vocals
Matthew "Da Kurlzz" Busek – vocals, drums, percussion

Additional musicians
Jeffrey "Shady Jeff" Phillips – vocals, programming

Additional personnel
Danny Lohner – production, mixing, mastering

Charts

References

2008 compilation albums
Hollywood Undead albums
A&M Records compilation albums
Albums produced by Danny Lohner
2008 EPs
A&M Records EPs